The Bx3 bus constitutes the University Avenue Line public transit line in The Bronx and Manhattan, operating between Washington Heights, Manhattan at Broadway & 179th Street, and Kingsbridge, Bronx, at 238th Street station on the  line. It operates mainly via University Avenue, serving the West Bronx and Upper Manhattan.

Current route 
The Bx3 starts with the  buses at 179th Street in Washington Heights, Manhattan. It then uses 181st Street to access the Washington Bridge, which it uses to get to The Bronx. Immediately after the bridge, it turns onto University Avenue, which it continues on until Kingsbridge Road, serving Morris Heights and University Heights. After doing a dogleg turn onto Sedgwick Avenue, it passes through the Kingsbridge Heights neighborhood, before using 238th Street to its terminus at Broadway

History 
Buses replaced University Avenue Line streetcars on October 25, 1947, operating as the Bx38. The route was renamed to the Bx3, and extended from 181st Street to 179th Street in September 1985. Until 1995, late night service terminated at Kingsbridge Road, it was extended to 238th Street in 1995.

Equipment 
The Bx3 operates out of Kingsbridge Depot. It uses Kingsbridge's fleet of 40-foot (12-metre) buses.

References 

Bus routes in the Bronx